The Dark Stairway is a 1953 British short film. It was one of a series of shorts made for British cinemas as second features in the 1950s made by Anglo-Amalgamated at the Merton Park Studios as part of the Scotland Yard film series. They are narrated by crime writer Edgar Lustgarten, and were subsequently broadcast as television episodes.

The film was also known as The Greek Street Murder.

Plot
A blind man, George Benson, witnesses the murder of Harry Carpenter by Joe Lloyd. Benson finds himself accused of the murder. Inspector Jack Harmer finds the murder weapon and discovers Carpenter was murdered because he betrayed Lloyd to the police. Benson manages to identify Lloyd by his ring, voice and hair products' smell.

Cast
Russell Napier as Inspector Harmer
Vincent Ball as Sergeant Gifford
George Manship as George Benson
Edwin Richfield as Joe Lloyd

Napier reappeared as Inspector Harmer in the 1954 episode The Strange Case of Blondie, but subsequently went on to play Inspector Duggan in thirteen episodes between 1956 and 1961.

References

External links

The Dark Stairway at BFI

1953 films
British crime films
1953 crime films
British short films
1953 short films
British black-and-white films
1950s English-language films
1950s British films